Soft Lights and Hard Country Music is the ninth album by country singer Moe Bandy, released in 1978 (produced 1977/78 by Ray Baker) on the Columbia label recorded at CBS Recording Studio "B", Nashville, Tennessee.

Track listing
"Soft Lights and Hard Country Music" (Sanger D. Shafer) - 2:50
"Darling, Will You Marry Me Again" (Sanger D. Shafer, Warren Robb) - 2:50
"Paper Chains" (Steve Collom) - 2:42
"This Haunted House" (Sanger D. Shafer, Arthur Leo "Doodle" Owens) - 2:39
"If She Keeps Loving Me" (Glenn Martin) - 2:53
"That's What Makes The Juke Box Play" (Jimmy Work) - 2:40
"There's Nobody Home on the Range Anymore" (Ed Penney, Robert Shaw Parsons) - 2:54
"Are We Making Love or Just Making Friends" (Steve Collom) - 2:50
"A Wound Time Can't Erase" (Bill D. Johnson) - 2:46
"A Baby and a Sewing Machine" (Ken McDuffie) - 2:49

Musicians
Charlie McCoy (Courtesy of Monument Records)
Hargus "Pig" Robbins (Courtesy of Elektra Records)
Johnny Gimble
Weldon Myrick
Ray Edenton
Bunky Keels
Dave Kirby
Kenny Malone
Bob Moore
Leo Jackson
Reggie Young
Tommy Allsup

Backing
The Jordanaires

Production
Sound engineers - Lou Bradley & Ron Reynolds
Photography - Jim McGuire
Album design - Bill Barnes
Illustration - Gene Wilkes

1978 albums
Moe Bandy albums
Columbia Records albums
Albums produced by Ray Baker (music producer)